Coming Out is a 2000 South Korean short film directed by Kim Jee-woon.

Plot 
The film opens with a man being interviewed about his sister, who has recorded a video diary in which she makes a shocking confession to her friends and family. Purporting to be a true story, the bulk of the film is presented as a reconstruction of actual events.

Hyun-joo announces to her younger brother Jae-min and his girlfriend Ji-eun that she has an important confession to make, and asks them to record it on video. After issuing an apology to her parents, she reveals that she has been hiding a painful secret and is not like normal people; she is in fact a vampire. Jae-min and Ji-eun initially think she is playing a prank, but to prove her sincerity Hyun-joo bites into her wrist and starts to suck her own blood. She goes on to disclose further details of her life as a vampire, and dispels many of the common myths associated with the legend. Having heard of others like her overseas, she has decided to join a community of vampires living in England.

Going out at night to attract less attention, Jae-min films his sister as she feeds on a young woman in a telephone box. He and Ji-eun later talk to the woman, who remains unharmed, and she tells them that the experience was not painful, likening the sensation to an electric shock. The events prove to them that Hyun-joo is telling the truth.

Some time later, Ji-eun visits Hyun-joo who is now living in England. Curious to know how it feels being bitten by a vampire, she asks Hyun-joo to suck her blood. Choosing the inside of her thigh, Hyun-joo begins to feed on her friend.

Cast 
 Gu Hye-ju as Hyun-joo
 Shin Ha-kyun as Jae-min
 Jang I-ji as Ji-eun
 No Eul as Girl in telephone booth
 Kim Il-woong as Interviewer
 Im Won-hee as Tutor

Production 
Kim Jee-woon wrote and directed Coming Out as part of a project to distribute three digital short films online. Commissioned by venture group Media 4M, the project also included shorts by Jang Jin and Ryoo Seung-wan. Coming Out was shot with a Canon XL-1 camcorder during a time when digital filmmaking in South Korea was still in its infancy, and went on to inspire many other digital productions.

Release and critical response 
Coming Out was first broadcast online on 7 August 2000. In 2001 it was shown at the Fantasia Festival, and a report for Ain't It Cool News described the film as a "sexy and funny little short" with "a series of truly hilarious and unnerving scenes", also noting the "unmistakable overtones to the imagery" with regard to the final scene where Hyun-joo draws blood from her friend's thigh. Other festival screenings include the Puchon International Fantastic Film Festival in 2001, and the Thessaloniki International Film Festival in 2005. Coming Out was also included as a special feature on the UK DVD release of The Quiet Family, and a review at DVDActive praised it as "delicate, cerebral and contemporary cinema at its most profound."

See also
Vampire film

References

External links 
 
 

2000 films
Camcorder films
Films directed by Kim Jee-woon
Internet films
2000s Korean-language films
South Korean short films
Vampires in film
South Korean fantasy films
2000s South Korean films